Dota: Dragon's Blood is an adult animated epic fantasy streaming television series. It is based on Dota 2, a 2013 video game by Valve. The show is produced by Studio Mir in association with Ashley Edward Miller's company Kaiju Boulevard. The series premiered on Netflix on March 25, 2021, and has seen three seasons.

Plot
Set in a fantasy world of magic and mysticism, the story follows a Dragon Knight, Davion, who hunts and slays dragons to make the world a safer place. In a battle between demons and the dragon race of Eldwurm, the dragon Slyrak merges his soul with Davion. Along with the sun princess Mirana, Davion pursues a journey to stop the demon Terrorblade, who wants to kill all dragons and collect their souls.

Voice cast and characters
Yuri Lowenthal as Davion, a Dragon Knight who hates dragons for massacring his family as a boy. After witnessing Terrorblade's evil, he allies with the Eldwurms, aiding Mirana and Marci on their quest.
Lara Pulver as Princess Mirana, the exiled princess of the Nightsilver Woods. She goes on a quest with Marci, her mute bodyguard, handmaid, and best friend, to recover the stolen lotuses of her patron goddess Selemene.
Tony Todd as Slyrak, one of the Eight Great Dragons. Slyrak is a proud and destructive Eldwurm, using Davion as a host to stay alive and battle Terrorblade.
Troy Baker as the Invoker. A powerful magical Elven Sage who is pivotal to Mirana's quest, he hates Selemene for her role in the death of his child. He makes a deal with Terrorblade for his daughter's revival. He operates as a hidden antagonist, manipulating everyone to kill Selemene and six of the remaining eldwurm dragons.
 Troy also voices Nico Hieronimo, a pangolin-like being who meets and accompanies Luna while she is in prison.
Freya Tingley as Fymryn, a young Elven girl who steals lotuses from the Nightsilver Woods because of a prophecy about her Moon goddess, Mene.
Josh Keaton as Bram, Davion's squire, now serving Kaden in "curing" Davion of Slyrak's possession.
Kari Wahlgren as Luna. Once known as Scourge of the Plains, she commits war crimes upon the Elves who refuse to worship Selemene.
Alix Wilton Regan as Selemene. Goddess of the Moon, she is an antagonist to the Elven Enclaves who refuse to worship her, and declares war on them following Fymryn's theft of her Lotuses. Egotistical and sacrificial of her subjects with extreme prejudice on all who don't worship her, even her own daughter.
Stephanie Jacobsen as Drysi, leader of the Elven Resistance against the Dark Moon Order's colonization and conversion of her people under Selemene's zealots.
Anson Mount as Kaden. The only Dragon Knight to survive fighting an Eldwurm, he hunts for Slyrak who killed 29 of his friends in a battle 20 years ago.
 Matthew Waterson as Captain Frühling, the alcoholic inhabitant of Barrow Haven that commandeered the local soldiers against an Eldwurm attack.
JB Blanc as Terrorblade. Terrorblade is the main antagonist of the series, a demon aiming to kill all the dragons in a plan to reshape the universe he desires.
 Doug Bradley as Viceroy Kashurra, a mysterious Eldwurm who has contact with an ancient void that granted him sentience and the ability to disguise himself as a human.
 Julie Nathanson as Rylai, a woman that found her innate elemental affinity to ice. She creates trouble for all those around her. 
 Victoria Atkin  as Lina, Rylai's older sister with the strength of a nuclear bomb and ambition to match.

Episodes

Series overview

Book 1 (2021)

Book 2 (2022)

Book 3 (2022)

Production
The series was announced by Netflix on 17 February 2021. It is a joint collaboration between South Korean studio Mir and American company Kaiju Boulevard. Production Reve which is another studio in South Korea provided the animation services for Book One while Studio Mir took over for Book Two. The animation style is a blend of anime and Western animation.

Release
Dota: Dragon's Blood debuted on March 25, 2021, on Netflix. A teaser trailer was released on February 19, followed by a full trailer on March 1. A promotional video, titled "Basshunter Dota Revival", was released on YouTube alongside the show's debut. In it, Swedish musician Basshunter is singing "Vi sitter i Ventrilo och spelar DotA" while playing Dota 2, with scenes from Dragon's Blood shown in between. During The International 2021 immediately following a trailer for season two, a video with 2D animation from Studio Mir was shown revealing original character Marci was being added to Dota 2 as a playable hero. Marci was added to the game as a part of gameplay update 7.30e on October 28.

A second season was announced on April 19, 2021. Originally set for release on January 6, 2022, Book Two premiered on January 18. A third season premiered on August 11, 2022.

Reception
For the first season, the review aggregator website Rotten Tomatoes reports a 75% approval rating, based on 12 reviews, with an average rating of 7.60/10. The website's critics consensus reads: "While knowledge of the game isn't necessary, it might have been nice if Dota: Dragon's Blood had translated more of its narrative prowess to the small screen."

Notes

References

External links

 
 

2021 South Korean television series debuts
2021 American television series debuts
2020s South Korean animated television series
2020s American adult animated television series
American adult animated web series
American adult animated action television series
American adult animated fantasy television series
South Korean action television series
Anime-influenced Western animated television series
Animated series based on video games
Animated television series about dragons
Dota
Dragons in popular culture
English-language Netflix original programming
Netflix original anime
Television series by Studio Mir